Lamont Township is a township in Hamilton County, Kansas, USA.  As of the 2000 census, its population was 89.

Geography
According to the USGS, it contains one cemetery: Menno.

References
 USGS Geographic Names Information System (GNIS)

External links
 US-Counties.com
 City-Data.com

Townships in Hamilton County, Kansas
Townships in Kansas